The 2006 Magny-Cours Superbike World Championship round was the last round of the 2006 Superbike World Championship. It took place on the weekend of October 6–8, 2006 at the Circuit de Nevers Magny-Cours.

Results

Superbike race 1 classification

Superbike race 2 classification

Supersport race classification

References
 Superbike Race 1
 Superbike Race 2
 Supersport Race

Magny-Cours
Magny-Cours Superbike
Magny-Cours Superbike World Championship round